The Official Marvel Graphic Novel Collection (also referred to as The Ultimate Graphic Novels Collection) is a fortnightly partwork magazine published by Hachette Partworks. The series is a collection of special edition hardback graphic novel, collecting all the parts in a story-arc for one of Marvel's best known superheroes, often a fan-favourite or "important" story from Marvel comics lore.

The series is published in the UK, Russia, Ireland, Australia, New Zealand and South Africa by Hachette Partworks, in Poland by Hachette Polska, in the Czech Republic and Slovakia by Panini Fascicule, in Argentina, Brazil, Colombia, Perú and Chile by Editorial Salvat, in Bulgaria by Hachette Fascicoli and in France and Germany by the French mother company of Hachette Collections.
The first English-language issue was published in December 2011 priced at £2.99 (R29.95 in SA, $7.95 in AU) issue 2 was £6.99 (R79.95 in SA, $12.95 in AU) and from issue 3 onwards it was its normal price of £9.99 (R109.95 in SA, $19.95 in AU).

The series proved so successful for publisher Hachette Partworks that they launched a second series of 130 fortnightly graphic novel hardbacks entitled Marvel's Mightiest Heroes Graphic Novel Collection and a third (non-Marvel) series of 90 fortnightly graphic novel hardbacks entitled Judge Dredd: The Mega Collection, a fourth series of 100 fortnightly graphic novel hardbacks called Transformers: The Definitive G1 Collection (featuring Generation One strips from Marvel US and UK, Dreamwave and IDW) and a fifth series of 80 fortnightly graphic novel hardbacks entitled 2000 AD: The Ultimate Collection. It also inspired a similar partwork line from DC Comics and Eaglemoss Collections, the DC Comics Graphic Novel Collection and one featuring Star Trek comics from the sixties up until modern comics called Star Trek Graphic Novel Collection, and at the end of 2017 an even newer collection also by Eaglemoss DC Comics – The Legend Of Batman.

The collection was later re-released with alternative numbering in 2016, which concluded with Issue 170 in September 2022.

Book content
As well as the comic strip, each book features an introduction to the book, information on the character, writer and artist plus some of the artist's draft board sketches. 60 books are required to build up a panoramic picture on the spine by artist Gabriele Dell'Otto. In April 2014, a flyer accompanying issue #62 revealed the artwork by Dell'Otto had been extended to cover 120 volumes rather than the original 60.

Each issue number of the collection is not the same as the books volume number (e.g. issue #1 is volume 21) as the volume number is the chronological release order of the original publication, whereas the issue number is the order in which they were released within this collection. Issue #1 was launched twice in the UK. Early subscribers to issue #1 (volume 21) may have received an edition with a different spine from those that subscribed to the subsequent launch. The panoramic artwork on the spine of this edition does not align with the volumes 20 or 22.

Magazine
The first issue came with an extra magazine which contained information on the collection and short descriptions on some characters which will feature in the upcoming books. It also included some character history. The magazine also folded out into a giant poster depicting Marvel universe heroes drawn by Leinil Francis Yu.

List of books
Below is a list of the books from each issue in published date order. Only the first six issues were officially announced, but each issue features a further reading section which advertised future books and their volume number, though not release number. Early into the run, customer support provided a list of books to be published from issue seven onwards which was unverified, but proved to be accurate for sometime. The full list of issues was confirmed on the Hachette Partworks website but later removed as the order for some issues altered slightly.  Subsequently, via the collections official website the set was announced to continue for a further 60 issues. The release order for issues #73–120 was later verified via BookDepository.com In April 2016, the May catalogue for PreviewsUK confirmed that an issue #121 would be released as part of the original collection. Subsequently, via the official Facebook page, it was confirmed that the original collection would now continue for a further 20 issues, therefore extending the set to 140. In reply to a comment on the collection's Facebook page in May 2017, confirmation was made that the collection will now expand to 170 titles. Later in December, in reply to an email, a Facebook user was told that this has now been expanded, yet again with no prewarning to subscribers, to 200.

The collection has been confirmed as being extended again to 220 issues, with zero notification, in reply to a query as to the end number on one of Hatchetts Facebook posts in July 2019. The exact phrasing was to run to 220, not that it will end at 220. In April 2020, in response to a Facebook comment, the collection has been extended to 250 issues.

In a Facebook post in June 2021, Hachette confirmed that the Original Marvel Graphic Novel Collection (2011) would be extended to 280 issues and the more recent Marvel Graphic Novel Collection (2016) would be extended to 170 issues.

In a post by British Comic Heroes via Facebook in June 2022 it was said that Hachette were calling time on the Marvel - The Ultimate Graphic Novel Collection at issue 280, however in later post, British Comic Heroes clarified that that the Hatchette announcement did not actually confirm this.

Subscribers to the more recent Marvel Graphic Novel Collection (2016) received a letter with their package containing issue 170 advising the collection had now ended.  This confirmed the 2016 collection would be ending 110 graphic novels short of the original 2012 collection.

The table below contains the full list of issues as per the original printing of the collection beginning in December 2011. The final volume (280) was released in October, 2022 after nearly eleven years.

International exclusives

The following books were only released in Ireland, Czech Republic, Poland, Germany, Brazil, Russia, France, Perú, Argentina, Greece, Hungary and Bulgaria.

In Germany Astonishing X-Men: Gifted and Fear Itself (Part 1) were released with different covers.

In Brazil Venom was released with a different cover.

"Winter Soldier (Part 1)" was released in Germany with a picture, which was in other countries used for "Winter Soldier (Part 2)", on the cover.

International variants
In Poland, the collection was titled Wielka Kolekcja Komiksów Marvela (The Great Marvel Comics Collection) and was published in 170 issues from August 2012 to May 2019.

The same collection is being published in the Czech Republic and Slovakia from January 2013 as Ultimátní komiksový komplet (The Ultimate Comics Collection), with 199 KČ / 9.99 EUR per book from issue 3 onwards. The price increased to 219 KČ / 9.99 EUR per book from issue 38 onwards and then to 249 KČ / 9.99 EUR per book from issue 56 onwards. The books (at least according to first 4 books) come in slightly different order than the one in table above. The books are sold in Czech republic first and after 4 months the unsold books are distributed in Slovakia. The collection continues with issues 61–120, none of the books is marked as Classic.
In November 2015, test run of Nejmocnější hrdinové Marvelu (Marvel's Mightiest Heroes) was launched.

The collection debuted in Germany under the title Die offizielle Marvel-Comic-Sammlung (The Official Marvel Comic Collection) in January 2013.

In September 2013, after an initial test run, the collection was made available in Brazil by Editora Salvat as A Coleção Oficial de Graphic Novels Marvel (The Official Marvel Graphic Novel Collection), priced at R$29,90 from issue 3 onwards.

In Russia the series was launched in January 2014, under the title Marvel. Официальная коллекция комиксов (Marvel. Ofitsialnaya kollektsiya komiksov — Marvel. The Official Comics Collection). The collection is issued by the Russian branch of the Hachette in cooperation with the Panini Comics providing translation and page layout.

In March 2014 the collection started in France under the title Marvel Comics: La Collection de Référence

In Argentina, the collection started May 2014 under the title Colección Definitiva de Novelas Gráficas de Marvel. The same edition began to be sold in Peru beginning in September 2015.

In March 2016 a test run of four titles was launched in Romania under the title Colecţia Oficială de Romane Grafice Marvel but it wasn't picked up for a full run.

In Hungary, the collection started under the title Nagy Marvel Képregénygyűjtemény in January 2018.

In September 2019 the collection started in Greece under the title Η Επίσημη Συλλογή Graphic Novels της Marvel.

In September 2020 the collection started in Bulgaria under the title Върховна колекция графични романи Марвел.

Marvel's Mightiest Heroes
The second series from Hachette Partworks began in January 2013, with each issue focussing on a different heroic Marvel character. This time the books built up a panoramic picture on the spine by artist Marko Djurdjević. The format featured a relatively recent story as the volume's main feature story (billed first on the front cover), preceded by the first appearance story and in some cases another early appearance (e.g. Hawkeye's first appearance as a solo character plus his first appearance with The Avengers). Although the first four titles were announced, only three were published and subscribers were told the series had been postponed. However, the series was relaunched in January 2014 beginning with the same four issues, but this time the books built up a panoramic picture on the spine by artist Adi Granov. This means collectors who had purchased the original three volumes would have to purchase them again to complete the spine art.

The series was extended for an additional forty issues.

The series ended on 12 December 2018 after a total of 130 books.

List of books

International exclusives

The All Killer, No Filler Deadpool Collection
The third series from Hachette Partworks began in August 2018.

X-Men: The Essential Collection
Two further Marvel Collections were market trialed by Hachette, an Avengers series in 2018 and an X-Men series in 2019. The Avengers series did not go to a full release and remaining market trial stock was added to the Hachette webstore in early 2019 including oversized variants of the 3 trial books. In late October 2019 remaining market trial stock from the X-Men trial and an "Alien" and "Predator" series that had been trialed in late 2018 were also added to the webstore indicating that they were unlikely to go to a full launch. The Collection has been launched in France in October 2020.

Marvel Origines
A new collection on sale on the French version of Hachette site. This has been tested 10 months ago, and starts now, in August 2022.

It is intended to be completed in 100 issues.

It seems that the collection will be edited in order, starting with the oldest comics around 1961-1962 and estimated to arrive around the late sixties.
It seems also that the volumes follows the Italian collection which contains 300 issues in softcover. The first issues seem to be the exact replica, except for the hardcover.

References

External links

Lists of released issues at HachettePartworks.com
Original series
2016 series
Marvel's Mightiest Heroes

Partworks
2012 comics debuts
Comic book collection books
Marvel Comics lines